Sitara: Let Girls Dream is a 2020 Pakistani computer animated short film directed and written by Sharmeen Obaid-Chinoy. The film attempts to spotlight the issue of child marriage.

Plot 
In the old city of Lahore in the 1970s lives Pari, a fourteen-year-old girl who dreams of becoming a pilot. She treasures her book about trailblazer Amelia Earhart, and flies pretend-planes with her younger sister Mehr, unaware of the building tension between her parents. The reason for the tension soon becomes clear: Pari is being forced to marry a much older man. Her fate after the marriage ceremony is only hinted at, but Mehr joins her mother in her accusatory attitude towards her father, and even her brother brushes off the father's attempts at male camaraderie with him. The film is silent, but at its close a written message appears: "Around the world every year, the dreams of 12 million child brides will never take flight". As the credits roll, a series of still illustrations tell another story, of hope: The father has learned his lesson, and sends Mehr to school. She graduates, and becomes a pilot, flying away in a plane and outfit just like Amelia Earhart's.

Production 
The film was produced by Obaid-Chinoys production company, Waadi Animations. The team faced multiple challenges to create a high-level animation film in Pakistan, where there is little film education and thus few animation professionals, a dearth of equipment and software of the types and quality needed, and had to contend with faulty infrastructures. According to Obaid-Chinoy: 

The team began their work in 2012, sometimes watching YouTube tutorials, sometimes having the benefit of Pixar consultants assisting over Skype. By 2019, they had a film ready for release, and Sitara became the first Pakistani animated film to be released and distributed by Netflix USA.

Release 
Gucci hosted a special screening for the film at 2020 Sundance Film Festival in connection to their campaign #LetGirlsDream. It was released on 8 March 2020 on Netflix on the occasion of International Women's Day.

Awards 
The film won three awards at the 2019 Los Angeles Animation Festival, for Best Produced Screenplay, Best Music Score and the Humanitarian Award.

References

External links
 
 

2020s animated short films
Pakistani animated short films
Netflix specials
2020 computer-animated films
2020 short films
Pakistani animated films
2020s English-language films